Transformers: Generation 1 (also known as Generation One or G1) is a toy line from 1984 to 1990, produced by Hasbro and Takara. It was a line of toy robots that could change into an alternate form (vehicles such as cars and planes, miniature guns or cassettes, animals, and even dinosaurs) by moving parts into other places, and it was the first line of toys produced for the successful Transformers toy and entertainment franchise. The line was originally called The Transformers, with "Generation 1" originating as a term coined by fans of the toys when the Transformers: Generation 2 toy line was released in 1992. Hasbro eventually adopted the term "Generation 1" to refer to any toy produced in that era.

Development
In 1983, Hasbro representatives were sent to Tokyo Toy Show, a toy expo in Japan, in search of prospective toys that they could import to the North American market. At the time, Japanese toy manufacturer Takara was showcasing several transforming robot toys from lines such as Diaclone and Micro Change. Hasbro bought the rights to produce the toys, but decided to release them under a single brand to avoid confusing the market with several series with similar premises.

Prior to the Hasbro deal, Takara briefly sold Diaclone toys in specialty toy shops in the U.S. under the "Diakron" moniker, while in some parts of Europe, Diaclone enjoyed a small following with a comic book series for that market.

Hasbro had a business relationship with Marvel Comics, which had successfully produced the Hasbro tie-in comic book G.I. Joe: A Real American Hero, based on the Hasbro action figure G.I. Joe. Marvel was approached once again to provide a backstory for the new toy line. Marvel editor-in-chief Jim Shooter created an overall story, and editor Bob Budiansky created names and profiles for the characters.

When the toy line was released, it was supported by the Marvel Comics series, an animated television series, and a gamut of other merchandising tie-ins. The 1986 feature film The Transformers: The Movie generated $5,706,456 at the United States box office.

Premise

The Transformers plot has two factions of sentient alien robots: the heroic Autobots and the villainous Decepticons. Both sides are from a race called Transformers – robots that can change into vehicles, mechanical devices and even animal forms. They have waged civil war for eons on their home planet of Cybertron, a war that had started several million years B.C., before humans even existed on Earth. Their planet of Cybertron had become decimated and both factions have been reduced to scavenging for needed supplies, primarily energy. The Autobots leave their planet on a space ship, and the Decepticons follow them in their own vessel. When the Decepticons board the Autobot ship, a battle breaks out, and with nobody controlling the ship, it crashes onto prehistoric Earth and knocks the Transformers unconscious. Millions of years later, in 1984, the dormant volcano the Autobot ship had crashed on becomes active. The eruption re-sets the ship's computer, which deploys a probe to study the planet. The computer learns that the planet is inhabited, and in order to survive first contact the computer both repairs the disabled Transformers and re-configures them with physical forms based on vehicles and machines of human origin. The Transformers are now able to hide by changing into vehicles or devices in case humans turn out to be hostile.

This initial premise, in all three media of toys, TV series, and comics, became more cosmic in scale. More stories began to be set in outer space and on alien worlds, especially after The Transformers: The Movie.

Additional story elements are also added to the series, such as establishing the origins of the Transformers race. A cruel and coldly logical race of alien squid-like creatures with five faces and tentacles known as Quintessons, who were the creators of the Autobots and Decepticons. They also created a gigantic factory that would become Cybertron. Eventually the design of the robots would become so sophisticated they developed emotions, self-awareness, and the machines went into rebellion, known as the 1st Cybertronian War. After successfully seizing control of Cybertron the robots lived in peace until the Decepticons could not resist or overcome their innate desire for military campaign and attempted a coup. The Autobots only overcame the Decepticons in the 2nd Cybertronian war by developing transformation to hide as mundane objects, vehicles, or tools. After copying the transformation ability of Autobots and creating a new leader named Megatron, the Decepticons launched into a 3rd Cybertronian war that would see Cybertron ruined, at which point the TV series begins.

Two characters – each the greatest leader of his side, became the most iconic representatives of the series: Optimus Prime of the Autobots and Megatron of the Decepticons. After the featured film, Megatron was reformed as Galvatron, and Optimus Prime was replaced for the majority of the third season by Rodimus Prime, only to return at the end. Both Optimus Prime and Megatron continued to appear in one form or another in subsequent Transformers series, where they maintained their leadership roles.

History
The toys of Generation 1 have seven series by year.

Series 1
The first series features twenty-eight characters in all; eighteen Autobots and ten Decepticons.

Optimus Prime is the Autobot Commander and transforms into a tractor trailer truck – specifically a Freightliner COE 1980. While in its robot form, the toy consists of three separate parts: the main figure, which transforms into the cabin of the truck; an Autobot Headquarters, which transforms into the tractor trailer, serves as a combat deck, and includes a mechanic/artillery robot; and a small scout car named Roller, which launches from the Autobot Headquarters.

The eleven Autobot cars consist of Bluestreak, Hound, Ironhide, Jazz, Mirage, Prowl, Ratchet, Sideswipe, Sunstreaker, Trailbreaker, and Wheeljack. Bluestreak, the gunner, transforms into a Datsun Fairlady 280ZX; Hound, the scout, transforms into a Mitsubishi J59 Jeep; Ironhide, who serves as security, transforms into a 1980 Nissan Onebox Cherry Vanette; Jazz, the special operations expert, transforms into a 1976 Porsche 935 Martini (#4); Mirage, the spy, transforms into a Ligier JS11 Formula 1 Racer; Prowl, the military strategist, transforms into a Datsun Fairlady 280ZX Police Cruiser; Ratchet, the medic, transforms into a Nissan Onebox Ambulance Vanette; Sideswipe, a warrior, transforms into a Lamborghini Countach prototype crafted from the LP500S model; Sunstreaker, who is Sideswipe's twin brother, and is also a warrior, transforms into a Lamborghini Countach LP500S; Trailbreaker, the defense strategist, transforms into a Toyota Hi-Lux 4WD; and Wheeljack, the mechanical engineer, transforms into a Lancia Stratos Turbo #539 "Alitalia".

Almost all of the first year Autobot cars were nearly identical in appearance to their Diaclone counterparts with the exception of Bluestreak and Ironhide.  All box art as well as catalog and instructions for Bluestreak show a blue Fairlady Z with a silver hood.  The toy itself was only sold in solid silver.  There has been rumors of a "blue" Bluestreak being released in the US market but no boxed examples have been identified.  Ironhide is a red Nissan Onebox Cherry Vannette and the Diaclone version was black.

The six Autobot minicars consist of Brawn, Bumblebee, Cliffjumper, Gears, Huffer, and Windcharger. Brawn, who serves in demolitions, transforms into a Land Rover Defender 4x4; Bumblebee transforms into a Classic Volkswagen Beetle; Cliffjumper, a warrior, transforms into a Porsche Turbo 924; Gears, who serves as a transport and in reconnaissance, transforms into a 4WD off-road truck; Huffer, the construction engineer, transforms into the cabin of a semi truck; and Windcharger, a warrior, transforms into a Pontiac Firebird Trans Am.

A yellow Familia 1500XG minicar dubbed "Bumblejumper" and later known as Bumper was released on Cliffjumper backer cards.  No carded examples have been found with the minicar on a Bumblebee backer card.

Megatron is the Decepticon Leader and can transform into three different types of guns; a Walther P38 handgun, a particle beam cannon, and a telescopic laser cannon.

Soundwave is the Decepticon Communicator and transforms into a microcassette recorder modeled after a 1980s Sony Walkman. The five Decepticon microcassettes are Buzzsaw, Frenzy, Laserbeak, Ravage, and Rumble. Buzzsaw, the spy, resembles a condor while in robot form and came packaged with Soundwave. Laserbeak, who serves in interrogation, also resembles a condor while in robot form and was sold with Frenzy, who is a warrior. Ravage, the saboteur, resembles a jaguar while in robot form and was sold with Rumble, who serves in demolitions.

The three Decepticon planes are Skywarp, Starscream, and Thundercracker. All three of them transform into F-15 Eagles. Skywarp and Thundercracker are both warriors, while Starscream is the Aerospace Commander.

To save production costs in developing separate chassis for multiple toys, many of the G1 Transformers are simply re-painted or re-accessorized clones of one another.  The physical actions to transform one or the other between modes was identical.  For example:

Ironhide and Ratchet are functionally identical to one another.
Cliffjumper, Bumblebee, Hubcap and Bumblejumper aka Bumper are all functionally identical to one another.
Prowl, Bluestreak, and Smokescreen are functionally identical to one another.
Trailbreaker and Hoist are functionally identical to one another.
Grapple and Inferno are functionally identical to one another.
Rumble and Frenzy are functionally identical to one another.
Laserbeak and Buzzsaw are functionally identical to one another.
Sideswipe and Red Alert are functionally identical to one another.
Optimus Prime's and Ultra Magnus' cab section are functionally identical to one another.
Pipes and Huffer are functionally identical to one another.

Finally, Thundercracker, Starscream, and Skywarp are functionally identical to one another.  The Series 2 Decepticon jets (Thrust, Dirge, and Ramjet) all share the same robot centerline of the Series 1 jets with different attachable wing accessories (Thrust's have molded (non-functional) vertical turbofans in them, Dirge's are elongated like a hyper-performance flyer, and Ramjet's have ramjets... obviously).

As the series moved farther along beyond the first two series and new characters were introduced, this replication became fewer and farther between.  The newer toys tended to share thematic processes (such as the Headmaster and Targetmaster lines) but the physical manipulation of the toy to transform it between modes was generally unique to that character.

Series 2

Series 2 features reissued versions of all of the toys from Series 1 and also introduced seventy-six new toys. Although in a broad sense, forty-three of these new toys are Autobots, and thirty-one of them are Decepticons, the branding for the toy line became much more specific during this series, as various subgroups began to be introduced. As such, only thirty-five of these new toys are standard Autobots and only eighteen of them are standard Decepticons. Of the other new toys, five are branded as "Dinobots", three are branded as "Omnibots", six are branded as "Constructicons", and seven are branded as "Insecticons"; the Dinobots and the Omnibots are both subgroups of the Autobots, while the Constructicons and the Insecticons are both subgroups of the Decepticons. Each following series of Generation 1 introduced more subgroups to the toy line, and continued the practice established by Series 2 of aligning those with names ending in the suffix "-bot" with the Autobots, and those with names ending in the suffix "-con" with the Decepticons. Rounding out the seventy-six new toys of the series, are the first two accessories of the toy line to be individually sold.

Can you find the black square label on your Transformer? Rub the label-Watch the robot face appear! It is your evidence that this robot is a "true" Transformer! was operating explanation for the heat sensitive rub signs, as found in the instruction booklets for toys that were new to Series 2, and in brochures that were included with the reissued Series 1 toys.

All of the toys released during Series 2, both those that were new to the series, as well as the reissued versions of Series 1 toys, featured heat sensitive rub signs. These would reveal either the Autobot logo or the Decepticon logo upon being rubbed. Intended as a means of authentication, they were introduced in response to similar, though inferior, bootleg toys that were being released at the time.

Series 2 features seven new Autobot Cars. They consist of Grapple, Hoist, Inferno, Red Alert, Skids, Smokescreen, and Tracks. Grapple, the architect, transforms into a crane; Hoist, who serves in maintenance, transforms into a Toyota Hi-Lux 4WD tow truck model; Inferno, who serves in search and rescue, transforms into a fire engine; Red Alert, the security director, transforms into a fire chief's Lamborghini Countach; Skids, the theoretician, transforms into a Honda City Turbo; Smokescreen, the diversionary tactician, transforms into a 1979 custom Datsun 280ZX; and Tracks, a warrior, transforms into a 1980 Chevrolet Corvette.

Series 2 features five new Autobot minicars. They consist of Beachcomber, Cosmos, Powerglide, Seaspray, and Warpath. Beachcomber, the geologist, transforms into a dune buggy; Cosmos, who serves in reconnaissance and communications, transforms into a flying saucer; Powerglide, a warrior, transforms into an A-10 Thunderbolt II airplane; Seaspray, who serves in naval defense, transforms into a hovercraft; and Warpath, a warrior, transforms into a tank.

Series 2 features two Autobot Jumpstarters; Topspin and Twin Twist. Both of them transform into spaceships. Topspin serves in land and sea assault, and Twin Twist serves in demolitions.

Series 2 features two Autobot Deluxe Vehicles; Roadbuster and Whirl. Roadbuster, the Ground Assault Commander, transforms into a 4-WD vehicle, and Whirl, who serves in aerial assault, transforms into an Apache Helicopter.

1984 and 1985
The 1984-85 lines became the foundation of the Generation 1 series, with all of the classic characters introduced here. The two years were actually one single run, story-wise and thematically. This is most evident in the first and second seasons of the animated series.

The toys made use of molds and designs primarily from the Micro Change and Diaclone lines. The 1985 toyline introduced the idea of special subgroup teams like the Dinobots, Constructicons and Insecticons. Toward the end of the animated series’ second season, several characters from the 1986 line were introduced, particularly the Combiner teams.

Other characters were taken from different toy lines of other companies (see Re-licenses).

1986
The year of 1986 saw Hasbro start using original designs for many characters as fewer Microman and Diaclone molds were recycled. This was a banner year for the toy line as the tie-in animated feature, The Transformers: The Movie, was finally released. While the movie was not the blockbuster Hasbro hoped for, it marked a change in the direction the series in general was taking.

The last use of a non-Takara toy for the Hasbro line was also in 1986: Sky Lynx, originally manufactured by ToyBox. Cheap construction and disappointing features were its most notable problems.

New characters Rodimus Prime and Galvatron replaced Optimus Prime and Megatron in their respective roles. Subgroup teams became prevalent. The number of new characters increased from this year on. The TV series followed the movie and was now set in the future while the comics’ storyline continued to be set in the present time.

Optimus Prime and Megatron were both offered as a Movie Mail Away.  Both figures were identical to their original release with the exception of a more reinforced fist design for Optimus Prime.  Both figures came in their standard styrofoam insert but the box was a plain brown mailer box.  Each figure was accompanied with a "Movie Edition" certificate and sticker.

1987
As Transformers went on, new characters needed new gimmicks to stand out. As the number of Combiner teams had been reduced, the Headmasters and Targetmasters were introduced. Fortress Maximus and Scorponok became leaders of the Autobot and Decepticon forces respectively. The animated series had one more season but only three episodes were produced in America due to Sunbow losing its contract and its subsequent inability of renewal (coinciding with the G.I. Joe cartoon meeting their demise), leaving only the comics to support the toy line.

1988
Transformers continued on, despite less support and still managed to introduce a plethora of new characters. New Headmaster and Targetmaster characters were introduced, but the new driving forces for the line were the Pretenders and Powermasters (which featured the return of Optimus Prime).

1989

The toy line received a new logo design for its sixth year. The subgrouping idea was changed as characters were now limited to Pretender and Micromaster groups. These two groups were further subdivided into thematic teams. A few classic characters were revamped as Pretenders.

1990
In its final year in the US market, Transformers''' last burst was with a more expanded Micromaster line and the introduction of the Action Masters – non-transforming figures of classic characters with transformable vehicles and weapons.

International market
Of the countries Transformers was exported to, Japan and the UK were the only ones to innovate upon the toy line in the interim between 1990 and 1993, before the launch of the next series, Transformers: Generation 2.

The UK releases, while in general following the American releases and storylines, omitted a fairly large selection of the original toys from the US line. The UK line first started branching away from the US line in 1990 with the re-releases of several early toys under the "Classics" banner. However, it was 1991 when the UK line went in its own unique direction. Though there were only a few characters introduced, they were toys that none of the US audience had ever seen. The 1991 and 1992 toys also found their way to Asian and Australian stores. The 1991 line did away with the Micromasters but had additional Action Master characters, in addition to re-uses of some of Takara's previously Japanese-exclusive molds.

1992 saw the release of the Autobot Turbomasters, the Decepticon Predators, yellow unnamed versions of the Constructicons (minus the parts to make Devastator), and re-colored versions of four sixths of the Japanese-exclusive Breastforce, simply known collectively as the Rescue Force. In early 1993, more exclusive figures were released under the Transformers (no subtitle) label, most notably the color-changing Stormtroopers, the Lightformers, the Trakkons, and the Autobot and Decepticon Obliterators. The heads of the Obliterators, Pyro and Clench, were the inspiration for the redesigned Autobot and Decepticon symbols that were used on this year's packaging and later used for Transformers: Generation 2.

The Japanese toy company Takara, from which Transformers had originated, had the rights to distribute the toys in Japan. Unlike Hasbro UK, Takara had more autonomy for releases and storyline that were running concurrent with the American line. For example, several characters appeared that were only exclusive to the Japanese market and Toei Animation continued the animated series with their own storylines.

In 1989, Takara departed from the lineup of characters that Hasbro released that year, choosing instead to use a different set of characters. In 1990, the Micromaster concept was embraced wholeheartedly as the majority of the toys that year and the next were of that nature. 1991 would see more Micromasters released, including the first Micromaster combiner, alongside three larger Battlestars. One of which was Star Convoy, a reborn version of Optimus Prime. Uniquely, the 1991 range in Japan consisted of only Autobot characters. The 1992 range in Japan was the final year of Generation 1, and featured several more Micromaster combiners, recolored versions of Defensor and Bruticus, and the smaller Turbomasters and Predators which were concurrently released in Europe.

Re-licenses
These toys were re-licensed or remolded from an existing toyline or animated series.

Animated series

The animated series was produced by Sunbow Productions, Marvel Productions, and Toei Animation (occasionally by AKOM).

In March 2009, Shout! Factory announced that they had acquired license from Hasbro to re-release Transformers on DVD in Region 1. The Complete First Season: 25th Anniversary edition was released on June 16, 2009. The set includes 16 episodes, in addition to bonus footage, including: The history of Hasbro and the origins of Transformers. Season 2, Volume 1 was released on September 15, 2009. Season 2, Volume 2 was released on January 12, 2010.

In addition, On October 20, 2009, Shout! Factory released the complete series in a single box set for the first time in Region 1. This set, dubbed "Transformers- The Complete Series: The Matrix of Leadership Collector's Set" features all 98 remastered episodes along with all new bonus features on 16 DVDs.

Comics

Three publishers had or have the license to produce comic books based on the Transformers. Marvel Comics held the license during the original run of the toy line. Marvel's UK branch also published their own Transformers stories. Dreamwave Productions revived Transformers comics in 2002 but went bankrupt in 2005, forcing a cessation. IDW Publishing picked up the rights soon after.

Each publisher to pick up the comics rights all chose to go with their own continuity than continue the hanging storylines from the previous publisher. As the comics regularly features characters dying, thus far, this is the only way to get around regarding use of characters and issues regarding their place in continuity. Also, the series by Marvel UK used the stories from the US but as the series run weekly, additional stories had to be made to act as supplement. These UK only stories often worked in and around the US stories, offering a different experience.

So far, there are four comic book continuities based on the Generation 1 characters:

Reception
In 1986, film critic Richard Martin called the first generation toy series a more fun counterpart to Rubik's Cube in "[helping] children develop their hand-eye coordination and their spatial reasoning skills, but Hasbro kept quiet about this, believing no self-respecting 10-year-old boy would bug his parents half to death to buy him an educational toy". He said "[kids mastered] its difficulties in no time [but it makes] grown-ups feel like klutzes". He said the resulting TV show "has topped the ratings every week since its debut in 1985, thus setting the stage for The Transformers: The Movie'' (1986) [which is] designed to sell more toys to more kids. [...] Transformers don't really die, they just become new products."

References 

 
Products introduced in 1984
1980s toys
Generation 1
Works by Len Wein